Triodia is a genus of moths of the family Hepialidae. There are seven described species found in northern and western Eurasia.

Species
Triodia adriaticus - Balkans
Triodia amasinus - Balkans, Turkey
Triodia froitzheimi - Jordan
Triodia laetus - Central Russia, Armenia
Triodia mlokossevitschi - Armenia
Triodia nubifer - Central Russia, Kazakhstan
Triodia sylvina (orange swift) - Western Eurasia

External links
Hepialidae genera

Hepialidae
Exoporia genera
Taxa named by Jacob Hübner